The Faculty of Applied Sciences oversees four departments at the Wayamba University of Sri Lanka.

History of Wayamba University of Sri Lanka

Wayamba University of Sri Lanka was founded in 1991 as an applicated University of Rajarata in Wayamba Province. It was named the Rajarata University of Sri Lanka “Wayamba mandapa”.

On 17 August the Minister of Higher Education named a committee which was led by Mr. H.P.M Gunasena who named the Wayamba University of Sri Lanka as the 13th National University. The lectures were started on 1 October 1999.

The University has two campuses at Kuliyapitiya and Makandura. Kuliyapitiya campus consist of three faculties, Faculty of Technology, Faculty of Applied Sciences and the Faculty of Business Studies and Finance. The Makandura campus consists of Faculty of Agriculture & Plantation Management and Faculty of Livestock Fisheries & Nutrition.

There are some unity which operates under the purview of the Vice Chancellor such as the Computer Unit, Library and the Physical Department which are operated through a Director or a Coordinator.

The Faculty of Applied Sciences of the Wayamba University of Sri Lanka was established with effect from 1 October 1999 by Government Notification in the Extraordinary Gazette No.1093/8 of Tuesday, 17 August 1999. The Faculty is located at Kuliyapitiya Premises of the University and was assigned with four Department of Study namely, Computing & Information Systems, Electronics, Industrial Management and Mathematical Sciences.

The department of Mathematical Sciences offers courses in the areas of Mathematics & Mathematical Modeling and Statistics and the Department of Computing & Information System, Electronics, and  Industrial Management offer courses in the areas indicated by their titles.

Departments of the Faculty

The University of is guided by the Vice Chancellor currently Prof. A.N.F. Perera. Under the Vice Chancellor there are four Deans. The Dean of the Faculty of Applied Sciences Dr. E.M.P. Ekenayake. Under him there are four departments.

Department of Mathematical Sciences

The head of the Department of Mathematical Sciences is Mrs.G.S. Fransico. Logical and creative thinking are the fundamental approaches for effective and efficient problem solving for continual impartment.

Therefore, the main objective of the Department of Mathematical Sciences is to develop thinking power to obtain the required outcomes intended from any system.

To achieve the main objective of the Department of Mathematics & Mathematical Modeling and Statistics as two subject areas. These subject areas will include secure communication, actuarial science leading to insurance and banking, data analysis, sampling methods, designing experiments, addressing current issues, linear and integer programming to enhance productivity.

Department of Computing & Information System

The head of the Department of Computing & Information System is Dr. L.D.R.D. Perera. The information revolution which began in business has gone farthest in every field of life, society and of technology. Information is the foundation for the challengers o knowledge.

The main objective of the Department of Computing & Information System is to equip the students with a sound knowledge on IT to face the above challenges at their own work and employment. Therefore, this Department offers course modules in the following areas of the subject, and a project and an industrial training programme, to achieve the above objects.

Object-Oriented Programming
Database Management Systems
Data Communication & Computer Networks
Web Designing & e-Commerce
Advanced Operation System & Artificial Intelligence
The Department of Computing & Information Systems contributes to the academic programme of the Faculty of Applied Sciences by offering Computing and Information Systems (CMIS) as a major subject for the B.Sc. (General) Degree and the B.Sc. (Joint Major) Degree programmes which fulfills industry needs. From year 2017, they extended their service by offering a B.Sc. (Special) Degree in computer science to cater to the current needs of the industry as well as to ensure a path towards academia.

Department of Electronics
The head of the Department of Electronics is Prof. C.A.N. Fernando. The main intonation of this Department is to produce well-trained graduates who are competent in the field of Electronics with a sound managerial background. This is the only Department in the Sri Lankan University system, which offers Electronic as a subject for the Physical science undergraduates. The course module have been designed to enable the graduates to get immediate employments in the industrial sector. The undergraduates are equipped with conceptual knowledge as well practical skill on the areas such as,
Electronic and Magnetism
Analogue Electronic
Digital Electronic
Signal Processing and Data Acquisition
Microprocessor Technology

Department of Industrial Management
The head of the Department of  Industrial Management Dr. K.D.D.N. Dissanayake. The Department has related the future challenges and the importance of socio-economic development of Sri Lanka. Therefore, the Department of Industrial Management has articulated its main objectives to produce readily employable graduates to face 21st century management challenges.
To achieve the above objective, the Department offers a number of course modules, not only to gain the conceptual knowledge but also to have hands on experience in all aspects of information system development with exposure to business problem analysis and problem solving through “Design & Development of Computer Based Project” and hands on managerial experience through “Industrial Training” at manufacturing and service organization. These provide students with the opportunity to relate the academic content of the modules to practical applications.
A systematic conceptual frame work is built for the students in the following areas :
Production, Operations & Quality Management.
Accounting and Financial Management
Marketing Management
Management of Technology
Human Resources Management
Operation Research
Structured System Analysis & Design Methodology
Management information System
Industrial and Business Low
Strategic Management
Effective and Efficiency management in the industry is vital for enhancing productivity for the competitiveness of a nation. Therefore, Industrial Management plays a vital role to face the stringent competition in future in the midst of the rapid globalization.

References 
prospectus of The Faculty of Applied Sciences

Applied Sciences